Cikampek is a subdistrict of Karawang Regency, West Java, Indonesia and is divided into 10 administrative villages (kelurahan). The distance from Cikampek to Karawang city is 21 miles (34 km).

Transportation 

Cikampek is situated in an area where many routes pass through from Jakarta to Central Java and East Java, including railway stations linking the cities of Jakarta, Bandung and Cirebon by rail, and is a main intersection of routes between the three cities.  

Cikampek has two railway stations:
Cikampek Station (Operations Area 1 Jakarta)
Dawuan Station (Operations Area 1 Jakarta)

Public transport routes:
Bus: Cikampek - Bekasi (Bekasi Trans), Cikampek–Tasik, Cikampek–KP.Rambutan, Cikampek–Bogor, Cikampek–Pulogadung
Train: Services to the major cities of Cirebon, Semarang, Yogyakarta, Bandung, Surabaya.
Transport ELF: Cikampek–Bandung, Cikampek–Pamanukan, Cikampek–Pabuaran, Cikampek–Plered

Cikampek is also the name of a toll road that links the subdistrict to Jakarta and two other toll roads connect Cikampek to other cities in Java:
Jakarta–Cikampek Toll Road
Cipularang Toll Road
Cikampek–Palimanan Toll Road

The distance from Cikampek to the North Coast of West Java is 19 miles (30 km).

Economy 
Cikampek's main sources of income are industry, agriculture and trade and the city is known as the center of trade and industry in the Karawang Regency. The people of Cikampek are predominantly merchants, factory workers and civil servants, or work in the private sector. There are at least 4 major industrial areas in the subdistrict:
Bukit Indah City
Autocar Cikampek Industrial Zone
Industrial Area Indotaisei
PT.Pupuk Kujang Cikampek (Persero), a subsidiary of PT Pupuk Sriwijaya, Palembang

The Pertamina Fuel Depot has operated since 2006to serve consumers in the wider area east of Jakarta, including the city of Bekasi, Karawang Regency, Purwakarta Regency, Indramayu Regency, the city of Cirebon and Cirebon Regency.

References

External links 

 Industrial Area Kujang Cikampek
 Bukit Indah Industrial Area City Cikampek
 Lazuar Fm Cikampek Karawang

Karawang Regency
Populated places in West Java